The 2017 Nepalese local elections were held in Nepal in three phases on 14 May, 28 June and 18 September in 6 metropolitan cities, 11 sub-metropolitan cities, 276 municipalities and 460 rural municipalities. It was the first local level election to be held since the promulgation of the 2015 constitution.

Background
Local elections were held in 53 municipalities in February 2006 under regime of King Gyanendra but were boycotted by the major political parties and saw low voter turnout. Prior to 2006, the previous elections was held in 1997 with a mandate of five years. Elections were supposed to be held on 2002 but were delayed due to the then ongoing Nepal Civil War.

With the promulgation of the new constitution in 2015, a three-tier governance system was introduced, with national, provincial and local levels of governance. A Local Body Restructuring Commission was established as required by the constitution under the chairmanship of Balananda Paudel. The commission proposed 719 local structures which was revised to 753 by the government. The new local levels were formed by changing the existing cities and village development council and came into existence on 10 March 2017.

Electoral system
Local levels will have a Chairperson/Mayor and a Deputy chairperson/mayor. Local levels are further subdivided into wards which will have a ward chairperson and 4 members. Out of the 4 members 2 must be female. All terms are for a total of 5 years. The elections are direct in nature and with the one getting the most ballots is declared the winner.

Results

Overall Results

|-
! colspan="2" style="text-align:left;" | Parties
! Mayor/Chairman
! Deputy Mayor/Chairman
! Ward Chairman
! Ward Member
|-
| style="background-color:;" |
| style="text-align:left;"   | Communist Party of Nepal (Unified Marxist-Leninist)
| style="text-align:center;" |  294
| style="text-align:center;" |  331
| style="text-align:center;" |  2,560
| style="text-align:center;" |  10,912
|-
| style="background-color:;" |
| style="text-align:left;"   | Nepali Congress
| style="text-align:center;" |  266
| style="text-align:center;" |  223
| style="text-align:center;" |  2,286
| style="text-align:center;" |  8,679
|-
| bgcolor= |
| style="text-align:left;"   | Communist Party of Nepal (Maoist Centre)
| style="text-align:center;" |  106
| style="text-align:center;" |  111
| style="text-align:center;" |  1,102
| style="text-align:center;" |  4,123
|-
| style="background-color:#FFC0CB;" |
| style="text-align:left;"   | Federal Socialist Forum, Nepal
| style="text-align:center;" |  34
| style="text-align:center;" |  32
| style="text-align:center;" |  262
| style="text-align:center;" |  1,111
|-
|bgcolor="FFb300" |
| style="text-align:left;" | Rastriya Janata Party Nepal
| style="text-align:center;" |  25
| style="text-align:center;" |  30
| style="text-align:center;" |  195
| style="text-align:center;" |  862
|-
| style="background-color:lightgreen;" |
| style="text-align:left;"   | Nepal Loktantrik Forum
| style="text-align:center;" |  9
| style="text-align:center;" |  8
| style="text-align:center;" |  88
| style="text-align:center;" |  356
|-
| style="background-color:;" |
| style="text-align:left;"   | Independents
| style="text-align:center;" |  6
| style="text-align:center;" |  5
| style="text-align:center;" |  91
| style="text-align:center;" |  131
|-
| style="background-color:" |
| style="text-align:left;"   | Rastriya Prajatantra Party
| style="text-align:center;" |  5
| style="text-align:center;" |  7
| style="text-align:center;" |  59
| style="text-align:center;" |  214
|-
|bgcolor=#9ACD32|
| style="text-align:left;"   | Rastriya Janamorcha
| style="text-align:center;" |  3
| style="text-align:center;" |  4
| style="text-align:center;" |  33
| style="text-align:center;" |  146
|-
| style="background-color:crimson;" |
| style="text-align:left;"   | Naya Shakti Party, Nepal
| style="text-align:center;" |  2
| style="text-align:center;" |  1
| style="text-align:center;" |  22
| style="text-align:center;" |  91
|-
|bgcolor=#0000FF|
| style="text-align:left;" | Nepali Janata Dal
| style="text-align:center;" |  2
| style="text-align:center;" |  0
| style="text-align:center;" |  7
| style="text-align:center;" |  30
|-
|bgcolor=#FF8080|
| style="text-align:left;"   | Nepal Workers' and Peasants' Party
| style="text-align:center;" |  1
| style="text-align:center;" |  1
| style="text-align:center;" |  22
| style="text-align:center;" |  75
|-
| style="background-color:darkblue;" |
| style="text-align:left;"   | Bahujan Shakti Party
| style="text-align:center;" |  0
| style="text-align:center;" |  0
| style="text-align:center;" |  8
| style="text-align:center;" |  34
|-
|bgcolor=#1E90FF|
| style="text-align:left;"   | Rastriya Janamukti Party
| style="text-align:center;" |  0
| style="text-align:center;" |  0
| style="text-align:center;" |  3
| style="text-align:center;" |  17
|-
|bgcolor=#4682B4 |
| style="text-align:left;" | Rastriya Prajatantra Party (Democratic)
| style="text-align:center;" |  0
| style="text-align:center;" |  0
| style="text-align:center;" |  2
| style="text-align:center;" |  5
|-
|bgcolor=#FFFFFF|
| style="text-align:left;"   | Federal Democratic National Forum
| style="text-align:center;" |  0
| style="text-align:center;" |  0
| style="text-align:center;" |  1
| style="text-align:center;" |  6
|-
|bgcolor=#B03020|
| style="text-align:left;"   | Communist Party of Nepal (Marxist-Leninist)
| style="text-align:center;" |  0
| style="text-align:center;" |  0
| style="text-align:center;" |  1
| style="text-align:center;" |  3
|-
| style="background-color:#00FFFF;" |
| style="text-align:left;"   | Nepal Pariwar Dal
| style="text-align:center;" |  0
| style="text-align:center;" |  0
| style="text-align:center;" |  0
| style="text-align:center;" |  1
|-
! colspan="2" style="text-align:left;" | Total
! 753
! 753
! 6,742
! 26,790
|}

Results by province

Province No. 1 

|-
! colspan="2" style="text-align:left;" | Parties
! Mayor/Head
! Deputy Mayor/Head
! Ward Chair
! Ward Member
|-
| style="background-color:;" |
| style="text-align:left;" | Communist Party of Nepal (Unified Marxist-Leninist)
| style="text-align:center;" |  69
| style="text-align:center;" |  85
| style="text-align:center;" |  554
| style="text-align:center;" |  2511
|-
| style="background-color:;" |
| style="text-align:left;" | Nepali Congress
| style="text-align:center;" |  51
| style="text-align:center;" |  38
| style="text-align:center;" |  418
| style="text-align:center;" | 1492
|-
| style="background-color:darkred;" |
| style="text-align:left;" | Communist Party of Nepal (Maoist Centre)
| style="text-align:center;" |  9
| style="text-align:center;" |  7
| style="text-align:center;" |  114
| style="text-align:center;" |  388
|-
| style="background-color:lightgreen;" |
| style="text-align:left;" | Nepal Loktantrik Forum
| style="text-align:center;" |  3
| style="text-align:center;" |  4
| style="text-align:center;" |  20
| style="text-align:center;" |  80
|-
|bgcolor=#FFD700 |
| style="text-align:left;" | Rastriya Prajatantra Party
| style="text-align:center;" |  3
| style="text-align:center;" |  1
| style="text-align:center;" |  9
| style="text-align:center;" |  26
|-
| style="background-color:#FFC0CB;" |
| style="text-align:left;" | Federal Socialist Forum Nepal
| style="text-align:center;" |  2
| style="text-align:center;" |  2
| style="text-align:center;" |  28
| style="text-align:center;" | 106
|-
| style="background-color:;" |
| style="text-align:left;" | Independents
| style="text-align:center;" |  0
| style="text-align:center;" |  0
| style="text-align:center;" |  8
| style="text-align:center;" |  10
|- 
| style="background-color:crimson;" |
| style="text-align:left;" | Naya Shakti Party, Nepal
| style="text-align:center;" |  0
| style="text-align:center;" |  0
| style="text-align:center;" |  2
| style="text-align:center;" |  2
|-
|bgcolor=#FFFFFF|
| style="text-align:left;"   | Federal Democratic National Forum
| style="text-align:center;" |  0
| style="text-align:center;" |  0
| style="text-align:center;" |  1
| style="text-align:center;" |  6
|-
| style="background-color:#1E90FF;" |
| style="text-align:left;"   | Rastriya Janamukti Party
| style="text-align:center;" |  0
| style="text-align:center;" |  0
| style="text-align:center;" |  1
| style="text-align:center;" |  4
|-
|bgcolor=#B03020|
| style="text-align:left;"   | Communist Party of Nepal (Marxist-Leninist)
| style="text-align:center;" |  0
| style="text-align:center;" |  0
| style="text-align:center;" |  1
| style="text-align:center;" |  0
|-
! colspan="2" style="text-align:left;" | Total
! 137
! 137
! 1,156
! 4,513
|-
! colspan="6" |Source: Election Commission of Nepal
|}

Province No. 2 

|-
! colspan="2" style="text-align:left;" | Parties
! Mayor/Head
! Deputy Mayor/Head
! Ward Chair
! Ward Member
|-
| style="background-color:;" |
| style="text-align:left;" | Nepali Congress
| style="text-align:center;" |  40
| style="text-align:center;" |  35
| style="text-align:center;" |  338
| style="text-align:center;" | 1111
|-
| style="background-color:#FFC0CB;" |
| style="text-align:left;" | Federal Socialist Forum Nepal
| style="text-align:center;" |  26
| style="text-align:center;" |  25
| style="text-align:center;" |  191
| style="text-align:center;" |  815
|-
|bgcolor="FFb300" |
| style="text-align:left;" | Rastriya Janata Party Nepal
| style="text-align:center;" |  25
| style="text-align:center;" |  30
| style="text-align:center;" |  195
| style="text-align:center;" |  862
|-
| style="background-color:darkred;" |
| style="text-align:left;" | Communist Party of Nepal (Maoist Centre)
| style="text-align:center;" |  21
| style="text-align:center;" |  24
| style="text-align:center;" |  230
| style="text-align:center;" |  853
|-
| style="background-color:;" |
| style="text-align:left;" | Communist Party of Nepal (Unified Marxist-Leninist)
| style="text-align:center;" |  18
| style="text-align:center;" |  19
| style="text-align:center;" |  230
| style="text-align:center;" |  983
|-
| style="background-color:lightgreen;" |
| style="text-align:left;" | Nepal Loktantrik Forum
| style="text-align:center;" |  3
| style="text-align:center;" |  3
| style="text-align:center;" |  32
| style="text-align:center;" |  128
|-
|bgcolor=#0000FF|
| style="text-align:left;" | Nepali Janata Dal
| style="text-align:center;" |  2
| style="text-align:center;" |  0
| style="text-align:center;" |  7
| style="text-align:center;" |  30
|- 
| style="background-color:crimson;" |
| style="text-align:left;" | Naya Shakti Party, Nepal
| style="text-align:center;" |  1
| style="text-align:center;" |  0
| style="text-align:center;" |  5
| style="text-align:center;" |  16
|-
| style="background-color:;" |
| style="text-align:left;" | Independents
| style="text-align:center;" |  0
| style="text-align:center;" |  0
| style="text-align:center;" |  32
| style="text-align:center;" |  26
|-
|bgcolor=#FFD700 |
| style="text-align:left;" | Rastriya Prajatantra Party
| style="text-align:center;" |  0
| style="text-align:center;" |  0
| style="text-align:center;" |  6
| style="text-align:center;" |  22
|-
| style="background-color:#1E90FF;" |
| style="text-align:left;"   | Rastriya Janamukti Party
| style="text-align:center;" |  0
| style="text-align:center;" |  0
| style="text-align:center;" |  2
| style="text-align:center;" |  6
|-
|bgcolor=#4682B4 |
| style="text-align:left;" | Rastriya Prajatantra Party (Democratic)
| style="text-align:center;" |  0
| style="text-align:center;" |  0
| style="text-align:center;" |  2
| style="text-align:center;" |  5
|-
| style="background-color:darkblue;" |
| style="text-align:left;"   | Bahujan Shakti Party
| style="text-align:center;" |  0
| style="text-align:center;" |  0
| style="text-align:center;" |  1
| style="text-align:center;" |  4
|-
! colspan="2" style="text-align:left;" | Total
! 136
! 136
! 1,271
! 5,075
|-
! colspan="6" |Source: Election Commission of Nepal
|}

Province No. 3 

|-
! colspan="2" style="text-align:left;" | Parties
! Mayor/Head
! Deputy Mayor/Head
! Ward Chair
! Ward Member
|-
| style="background-color:;" |
| style="text-align:left;" | Communist Party of Nepal (Unified Marxist-Leninist)
| style="text-align:center;" |  64
| style="text-align:center;" |  69
| style="text-align:center;" |  537
| style="text-align:center;" |  2,333
|-
| style="background-color:;" |
| style="text-align:left;" | Nepali Congress
| style="text-align:center;" |  35
| style="text-align:center;" |  32
| style="text-align:center;" |  367
| style="text-align:center;" |  1,324
|-
| style="background-color:darkred;" |
| style="text-align:left;" | Communist Party of Nepal (Maoist Centre)
| style="text-align:center;" |  16
| style="text-align:center;" |  17
| style="text-align:center;" |  176
| style="text-align:center;" |  660
|-
|bgcolor=#FFD700 |
| style="text-align:left;" | Rastriya Prajatantra Party
| style="text-align:center;" |  1
| style="text-align:center;" |  1
| style="text-align:center;" |  15
| style="text-align:center;" |  43
|-
|bgcolor=#FF8080|
| style="text-align:left;" | Nepal Workers' and Peasants' Party
| style="text-align:center;" |  1
| style="text-align:center;" |  1
| style="text-align:center;" |  12
| style="text-align:center;" |  40
|- 
| style="background-color:crimson;" |
| style="text-align:left;" | Naya Shakti Party, Nepal
| style="text-align:center;" |  1
| style="text-align:center;" |  0
| style="text-align:center;" |  5
| style="text-align:center;" |  24
|-
| style="background-color:;" |
| style="text-align:left;" | Independents
| style="text-align:center;" |  0
| style="text-align:center;" |  0
| style="text-align:center;" |  7
| style="text-align:center;" |  6
|-
| style="background-color:lightgreen;" |
| style="text-align:left;" | Nepal Loktantrik Forum
| style="text-align:center;" |  0
| style="text-align:center;" |  0
| style="text-align:center;" |  2
| style="text-align:center;" |  3
|-
! colspan="2" style="text-align:left;" | Total
! 119
! 119
! 1,121
! 4,433
|-
! colspan="6" |Source: Election Commission of Nepal
|}

Province No. 4

|-
! colspan="2" style="text-align:left;" | Parties
! Mayor/Head
! Deputy Mayor/Head
! Ward Chair
! Ward Member
|-
| style="background-color:;" |
| style="text-align:left;" | Nepali Congress
| style="text-align:center;" |  44
| style="text-align:center;" |  37
| style="text-align:center;" |  342
| style="text-align:center;" |  1,351
|-
| style="background-color:;" |
| style="text-align:left;" | Communist Party of Nepal (Unified Marxist-Leninist)
| style="text-align:center;" |  34
| style="text-align:center;" |  36
| style="text-align:center;" |  316
| style="text-align:center;" |  1,261
|-
| style="background-color:darkred;" |
| style="text-align:left;" | Communist Party of Nepal (Maoist Centre)
| style="text-align:center;" |  5
| style="text-align:center;" |  7
| style="text-align:center;" |  69
| style="text-align:center;" |  267
|-
|bgcolor=#9ACD32|
| style="text-align:left;" | Rastriya Janamorcha
| style="text-align:center;" |  1
| style="text-align:center;" |  2
| style="text-align:center;" |  15
| style="text-align:center;" |  56
|-
| style="background-color:;" |
| style="text-align:left;" | Independents
| style="text-align:center;" |  1
| style="text-align:center;" |  1
| style="text-align:center;" |  10
| style="text-align:center;" |  32
|-
|bgcolor=#FFD700 |
| style="text-align:left;" | Rastriya Prajatantra Party
| style="text-align:center;" |  0
| style="text-align:center;" |  2
| style="text-align:center;" |  2
| style="text-align:center;" |  12
|-
| style="background-color:crimson;" |
| style="text-align:left;" | Naya Shakti Party, Nepal
| style="text-align:center;" |  0
| style="text-align:center;" |  0
| style="text-align:center;" |  5
| style="text-align:center;" |  24
|-
| style="background-color:#1E90FF;" |
| style="text-align:left;" | Rastriya Janamukti Party
| style="text-align:center;" |  0
| style="text-align:center;" |  0
| style="text-align:center;" |  0
| style="text-align:center;" |  2
|-
! colspan="2" style="text-align:left;" | Total
! 85
! 85
! 759
! 3,005
|-
! colspan="6" |Source: Election Commission of Nepal
|}

Province No. 5 

|-
! colspan="2" style="text-align:left;" | Parties
! Mayor/Head
! Deputy Mayor/Head
! Ward Chair
! Ward Member
|-
| style="background-color:;" |
| style="text-align:left;" | Communist Party of Nepal (Unified Marxist-Leninist)
| style="text-align:center;" |  43
| style="text-align:center;" |  47
| style="text-align:center;" |  355
| style="text-align:center;" |  1,498
|-
| style="background-color:;" |
| style="text-align:left;" | Nepali Congress
| style="text-align:center;" |  33
| style="text-align:center;" |  31
| style="text-align:center;" |  317
| style="text-align:center;" |  1,223
|-
| style="background-color:darkred;" |
| style="text-align:left;" | Communist Party of Nepal (Maoist Centre)
| style="text-align:center;" |  19
| style="text-align:center;" |  22
| style="text-align:center;" |  181
| style="text-align:center;" |  692
|-
|bgcolor=#FF8080|
| style="text-align:left;" | Federal Socialist Forum, Nepal
| style="text-align:center;" |  6
| style="text-align:center;" |  5
| style="text-align:center;" |  43
| style="text-align:center;" |  190
|-
| style="background-color:;" |
| style="text-align:left;" | Independents
| style="text-align:center;" |  3
| style="text-align:center;" |  0
| style="text-align:center;" |  21
| style="text-align:center;" |  44
|-
|bgcolor=#9ACD32|
| style="text-align:left;" | Rastriya Janamorcha
| style="text-align:center;" |  2
| style="text-align:center;" |  2
| style="text-align:center;" |  18
| style="text-align:center;" |  89
|-
| style="background-color:lightgreen;" |
| style="text-align:left;" | Nepal Loktantrik Forum
| style="text-align:center;" |  2
| style="text-align:center;" |  0
| style="text-align:center;" |  19
| style="text-align:center;" |  76
|-
|bgcolor=#FFD700 |
| style="text-align:left;" | Rastriya Prajatantra Party
| style="text-align:center;" |  1
| style="text-align:center;" |  1
| style="text-align:center;" |  17
| style="text-align:center;" |  65
|-
| style="background-color:crimson;" |
| style="text-align:left;" | Naya Shakti Party, Nepal
| style="text-align:center;" |  0
| style="text-align:center;" |  1
| style="text-align:center;" |  5
| style="text-align:center;" |  17
|-
| style="background-color:darkblue;" |
| style="text-align:left;"   | Bahujan Shakti Party
| style="text-align:center;" |  0
| style="text-align:center;" |  0
| style="text-align:center;" |  7
| style="text-align:center;" |  30
|-
| style="background-color:#1E90FF;" |
| style="text-align:left;" | Rastriya Janamukti Party
| style="text-align:center;" |  0
| style="text-align:center;" |  0
| style="text-align:center;" |  0
| style="text-align:center;" |  5
|-
! colspan="2" style="text-align:left;" | Total
! 109
! 109
! 983
! 3,929
|-
! colspan="6" |Source: Election Commission of Nepal
|}

Province No. 6 

|-
! colspan="2" style="text-align:left;" | Parties
! Mayor/Head
! Deputy Mayor/Head
! Ward Chair
! Ward Member
|-
| style="background-color:;" |
| style="text-align:left;" | Communist Party of Nepal (Unified Marxist-Leninist)
| style="text-align:center;" |  27
| style="text-align:center;" |  31
| style="text-align:center;" |  268
| style="text-align:center;" |  1,074
|-
| style="background-color:darkred;" |
| style="text-align:left;" | Communist Party of Nepal (Maoist Centre)
| style="text-align:center;" |  25
| style="text-align:center;" |  26
| style="text-align:center;" |  219
| style="text-align:center;" |  876
|-
| style="background-color:;" |
| style="text-align:left;" | Nepali Congress
| style="text-align:center;" |  25
| style="text-align:center;" |  16
| style="text-align:center;" |  203
| style="text-align:center;" |  776
|-
| style="background-color:;" |
| style="text-align:left;" | Independents
| style="text-align:center;" |  2
| style="text-align:center;" |  4
| style="text-align:center;" |  11
| style="text-align:center;" |  10
|-
|bgcolor=#FFD700 |
| style="text-align:left;" | Rastriya Prajatantra Party
| style="text-align:center;" |  0
| style="text-align:center;" |  2
| style="text-align:center;" |  7
| style="text-align:center;" |  36
|-
|bgcolor=#FF8080|
| style="text-align:left;" | Nepal Workers' and Peasants' Party
| style="text-align:center;" |  0
| style="text-align:center;" |  0
| style="text-align:center;" |  10
| style="text-align:center;" |  35
|-
| style="background-color:lightgreen;" |
| style="text-align:left;" | Nepal Loktantrik Forum
| style="text-align:center;" |  0
| style="text-align:center;" |  0
| style="text-align:center;" |  0
| style="text-align:center;" |  1
|-
| style="background-color:#00FFFF;" |
| style="text-align:left;" | Nepal Pariwar Dal
| style="text-align:center;" |  0
| style="text-align:center;" |  0
| style="text-align:center;" |  0
| style="text-align:center;" |  1
|-
|bgcolor=#9ACD32|
| style="text-align:left;" | Rastriya Janamorcha
| style="text-align:center;" |  0
| style="text-align:center;" |  0
| style="text-align:center;" |  0
| style="text-align:center;" |  1
|-
! colspan="2" style="text-align:left;" | Total
! 79
! 79
! 718
! 2,810
|-
! colspan="6" |Source: Election Commission of Nepal
|}

Province No. 7

|-
! colspan="2" style="text-align:left;" | Parties
! Mayor/Head
! Deputy Mayor/Head
! Ward Chair
! Ward Member
|-
| style="background-color:;" |
| style="text-align:left;" | Communist Party of Nepal (Unified Marxist-Leninist)
| style="text-align:center;" |  39
| style="text-align:center;" |  44
| style="text-align:center;" |  300
| style="text-align:center;" |  1,249
|-
| style="background-color:;" |
| style="text-align:left;" | Nepali Congress
| style="text-align:center;" |  38
| style="text-align:center;" |  34
| style="text-align:center;" |  301
| style="text-align:center;" |  1,192
|-
| style="background-color:darkred;" |
| style="text-align:left;" | Communist Party of Nepal (Maoist Centre)
| style="text-align:center;" |  10
| style="text-align:center;" |  9
| style="text-align:center;" |  113
| style="text-align:center;" |  400
|-
| style="background-color:lightgreen;" |
| style="text-align:left;" | Nepal Loktantrik Forum
| style="text-align:center;" |  1
| style="text-align:center;" |  1
| style="text-align:center;" |  15
| style="text-align:center;" |  68
|-
|bgcolor=#FFD700 |
| style="text-align:left;" | Rastriya Prajatantra Party
| style="text-align:center;" |  0
| style="text-align:center;" |  0
| style="text-align:center;" |  3
| style="text-align:center;" |  10
|-
| style="background-color:;" |
| style="text-align:left;" | Independents
| style="text-align:center;" |  0
| style="text-align:center;" |  0
| style="text-align:center;" |  2
| style="text-align:center;" |  3
|-
| style="background-color:crimson;" |
| style="text-align:left;" | Naya Shakti Party, Nepal
| style="text-align:center;" |  0
| style="text-align:center;" |  0
| style="text-align:center;" |  0
| style="text-align:center;" |  2
|-
! colspan="2" style="text-align:left;" | Total
! 88
! 88
! 734
! 2,924
|-
! colspan="6" |Source: Election Commission of Nepal
|}

Cities

Incidents 
The first phase of election was largely peaceful but there were sporadic instances of violence. A CPN-UML activist was killed in Gaurisankar Village Council, Dolakha on the eve of election. Another person was killed in Namobuddha municipality, Kavre on the day of election, the incident is still under investigation. One person died after security personnel opened fire during a clash between the cadres of Nepali Congress and CPN-UML in Melung Rural Municipality of Dolakha district on election day. A candidate from Rastriya Prajantantra Party died in Naraharinath Village Council, Kalikot after police opened fire when cadres of Netra Bikram Chand led CPN tried to capture the ballot boxes.

A reelection took place in one ward of Bharatpur after a CPN-Maoist Centre vote count representative tore 90 ballot papers when the count was in progress.

In the second phase, a UML cadre died after being hit by a stone in his testicles during a clash with Nepali Congress cadres at Chededaha Village council Bajura. A cadre of Netra Bikram Chand-led CPN Maoist died in Dhangadi, Kailali after a bomb carried by him exploded prematurely on June 26.

External links 
 Local Election Results(in Nepali)

References

Local
Local elections in Nepal
Nepal
Nepal
Nepal